Cartford Bridge is a single-track toll bridge in the English county of Lancashire. Built in 1831, it spans the River Wyre, connecting Little Eccleston-with-Larbreck, in the Borough of Fylde, on the southern side of the river, to Out Rawcliffe, in the Borough of Wyre, on its northern side (known locally as "Over Wyre"), carrying both automotive and pedestrian traffic of Cartford Lane. The tolls are £1 for vehicles exceeding five tonnes, 70p for vehicles exceeding two tonnes, 60p for motorised vehicles not exceeding two tonnes, and 20p for two-wheeled vehicles. (The toll was one shilling for cars, with no charge for motorcycles, in 1908, when the bridge was described as being "very awkward for motor cars, as there are iron channels for the cart wheels, and they are the wrong width for cars".) In 1966, it was one of twelve toll bridges on roads in England of level Class III (now Class "C") or higher.

The bridge, which is located nine miles from the mouth of the River Wyre at Fleetwood, was built by the squire of Rawcliffe Hall in 1831 after both his gamekeeper and his dairyman drowned crossing the ford it replaced.

The entire Rawcliffe Hall estate was auctioned off in 1926, to pay the death duties, and the Cartford Bridge Company was formed in 1929.

The Speight and Thickins families have managed the bridge since 1929. The last toll keepers they employed were there for over thirty years, until they retired in 2021, and new toll keepers appointed.

The Cartford Inn, which dates from at least the 19th century, stands on the southern side of the bridge.

Gallery

References

External links
"The Cartford Toll Bridge at Little Eccleston in Lancashire" – Mr H's Hot Pot, YouTube, February 25, 2019

Bridges across the River Wyre
Buildings and structures in the Borough of Wyre
Buildings and structures in the Borough of Fylde
Bridges completed in 1831
Toll bridges in England